The Egyptian Museum is a museum of Egyptian antiquities in Cairo, Egypt.

Egyptian Museum may also refer to:

 Grand Egyptian Museum, Giza, Egypt
 Egyptian Museum of Berlin, Germany
 Egyptian Museum of Florence, Italy
 Egyptian Museum (Milan), Italy
 Egyptian Museum of Turin (Museo Egizio), Italy
 Egypt Centre, Swansea University, UK
 Rosicrucian Egyptian Museum, San Jose, California, US